Triton was a  74-gun ship of the line of the French Navy.

Career 
Ordered in 1806 as Vénitien, Triton was not completed before 1823, long after the fall of the French Empire she was meant to defend and after the Bourbon Restoration.

Triton transferred to Toulon in 1835. In 1841, serving under Captain Bruat, she brought an epidemic of Gastroenteritis, then called "Cholera morbus", to Figuières.

In 1844, Triton took part in the Bombardment of Mogador.

Decommissioned in 1847, Triton served as a floating battery in Cherbourg before being towed to Rochefort in 1849, where she was used as a hulk into the 1870s.

Notes, citations, and references

Notes

Citations

References

Ships of the line of the French Navy
Téméraire-class ships of the line
1823 ships